Luigi Agostino Alfredo De Laurentiis (16 February 1917, in Torre Annunziata – 30 March 1992, in Rome) was an Italian film producer. His credits include Un borghese piccolo piccolo (director Mario Monicelli, 1977), Amici miei - Atto II° (director Mario Monicelli, 1982), Vacanze di Natale (director Carlo Vanzina, 1983) and Donne con le gonne (director Francesco Nuti, 1991).

Life
After graduating in law, he chose a film career in his 40s when he assisted his younger brother Dino De Laurentiis in the production of The Bandit. He was film editor on Le notti di Cabiria by Federico Fellini (1957) and after a short spell with fellow Italians Eduardo De Filippo and Totò, he then worked beside Dino for twenty years until Dino's move to the US. From 1975 he took part in the creation of Filmauro, working alongside his son Aurelio. In the 1960s and 1970s Luigi taught film production at Italy's Istituto Professionale di Stato per la Cinematografia e la Televisione

Sources
http://viaf.org/viaf/16764865
http://www.imdb.com/name/nm0209577

People from Torre Annunziata
1917 births
1992 deaths
Italian film producers